Marguerite Straus Frank (born September 8, 1927) is a French-American mathematician who is a pioneer in convex optimization theory and mathematical programming.

Education 
After attending secondary schooling in Paris and Toronto, Frank contributed largely to the fields of transportation theory and Lie algebras, which later became the topic of her PhD thesis, New Simple Lie Algebras.  She was one of the first female PhD students in mathematics at Harvard University, completing her dissertation in 1956, with  Abraham Adrian Albert as her advisor.

Contributions
Together with Philip Wolfe in 1956 at Princeton, she invented the Frank–Wolfe algorithm, an iterative optimization method for general constrained non-linear problems. While linear programming was popular at that time, the paper marked an important change of paradigm to more general non-linear convex optimization.

This algorithm is used widely in traffic models to assign routes to strategic models such as those using Saturn (software).

Career 
Frank was part of the Princeton logistics project led by Harold W. Kuhn and Albert W. Tucker.

In 1977, she became an adjunct associate professor at Columbia University, before moving to Rider University. Marguerite Frank was a visiting professor to Stanford (1985–1990), and ESSEC Business School in Paris (1991).

Recognition 
She was elected a member of the New York Academy of Sciences in 1981.

Personal life 
Marguerite Frank was born in France and migrated to U.S. during the war in 1939. She was married to Joseph Frank from 1953 until his death in 2013.  He was a Professor of literature at Stanford and an author of widely acclaimed critical biography of Dostoevsky.

Selected publications

References

External links

Living people
1927 births
American operations researchers
Numerical analysts
American computer scientists
French women computer scientists
20th-century American mathematicians
21st-century American mathematicians
American statisticians
Women statisticians
20th-century French mathematicians
21st-century French mathematicians
Harvard Graduate School of Arts and Sciences alumni
French women mathematicians
20th-century women mathematicians
21st-century women mathematicians
French emigrants to the United States
20th-century French women
21st-century French women